In Taiwan, driver licenses are issued by the Ministry of Transportation and Communications to a qualified motor vehicle driver. The number on a driver licenses is the same as the ID number of the license holder's household registration in Taiwan. In Taiwan, the driver license is sometimes accepted as a valid identity document, as its information replicates most of that on a National Identification Card.

Format

The driver licenses in Taiwan are only issued in Chinese. For comparison purposes the table below is shown in bilingual form.

Notes:
 License Number is identical to the National Identification Number.
 All dates are written in Republic of China calendar, the year is in three(3) digit format.
 Conditions: 
 A – Unlimited
 B – Automatic transmission cars only
 C – Other conditions on reverse side
 Date of expiry: Since July 2013, all the license are valid until the holder's 75th birthday. A citizen who is elder than 75 has to renew their driver license every 3 years.
 Date of issue: the date that the holder passed the driver test of the type
 Date of Inspection: date for taking driver's physical examination, for commercial driver's license only.

Categories
Driver licenses are categorized pursuant to the Road Traffic Security Rules (道路交通安全規則) in Taiwan. These 15 categories are:

 9. International Driving Permit: A multilingual translation a Taiwanese license for international use, issued after Vienna Convention on Road Traffic 1968. As the Republic of China has lost diplomatic relations with most countries since the 1970s, certain countries do not honor international driver permits from Taiwan.
 10. driver license of light-duty motorcycle: Formerly used, now splits into 11 and 12.
 13. driver license of heavy-duty motorcycle: Formerly used, now splits into 14 and 15.

Licenses and Motor vehicles

Driving tests
The minimum age pursuant to Article 60 is normally 18, but one must be at least 20 to get a professional license or a license for an ultra-heavy motorcycle. A professional license must be converted to an ordinary one at 60 years old, but a professional small vehicle driver may keep the license until they are 65 years old when passing annual physical examinations. Since driver jobs are not open to foreigners, foreigners cannot get professional driver licenses.

International Driving Permit 

Taiwan is a signatory of the 1968 "Vienna Road Traffic Convention" and recognizes the international driving licenses of all countries. However, due to the Republic of China's withdrawal from the United Nations in 1971, some countries did not recognize the status of Taiwan as a signatory state, nor did they recognize its international driving license. The Republic of China and these countries reciprocate in the mutual recognition and renewal with test exemption for driving licenses.

In Asia (including Pacific Islands), this includes Brunei, Japan, Hong Kong, Kiribati, Laos, Macau, Malaysia, Marshall Islands, Nauru, Palau, Papua New Guinea, Philippines, Samoa, Solomon Islands, South Korea, Thailand, Tuvalu, and Vietnam.

In Australia (a total of 6 states and 2 territories: Australian Capital Territory, New South Wales, Northern Territory, Queensland, South Australia, Tasmania, Western Australia, and Victoria.

In Europe, this includes Austria, Belgium, Denmark, France, Finland, Hungary, Ireland, Italy, Luxembourg, Netherlands, Poland, Portugal, Slovakia, and Switzerland.

In North America, a total of 39 states and territories of the United States participates: Arizona, Alabama, Arkansas, Colorado, Delaware, Florida, Georgia, Hawaii, Idaho, Indiana, Iowa, Kansas, Kentucky, Louisiana, Maryland, Minnesota, Mississippi, Nevada, New Mexico, New Jersey, North Dakota, Ohio, Oklahoma, Oregon, Pennsylvania, Rhode Island, South Carolina, Tennessee, Texas, Vermont, Virginia, West Virginia, Washington, Washington DC, Wisconsin, and Wyoming, and the US territories of Guam, US Virgin Islands, Puerto Rico. Canada includes these 10 provinces: Alberta, British Columbia, Manitoba, New Brunswick, Newfoundland and Labrador, Nova Scotia, Prince Edward Island, Ontario, Quebec, Saskatchewan.

In Central and South America, the list includes Costa Rica, Dominican Republic, El Salvador, Guatemala, Haiti, Mexico, Nicaragua, Panama, Saint Christopher, Saint Lucia, and Saint Vincent and the Grenadines.

To exchange a foreign driver's license for a ROC driver's license in Taiwan, the foreign driver's license must be verified by the ROC's foreign affairs office or the foreign ministry in Taiwan, such as the US Driver's License notary service of the American Institute in Taiwan.

Exchanging foreign license into Taiwan driver's license, for foreigners (Reciprocity Agreement) 
Holders of a valid full driver's license issued by a foreign, mainland China, Hong Kong or Macau government who obtained a certificate of permit to stay or stay for more than six months in Taiwan can be exempted from the test and reissued a Taiwan driver's license to an equivalent vehicle class upon entry, based on the principle of equality and reciprocity. This only applies to licenses from certain participating authorities (see above).

Exchanging foreign license into Taiwan driver's license, for Taiwanese 
Holders of a valid foreign full driver's license who has Republic of China nationality can be exempted from taking the test and be issued a Taiwan's driver's license for the same type of vehicle. This is applicable to countries not in the reciprocity agreement.

References

Transportation in Taiwan
Taiwan